Apollonioi is a former municipality on the island of Lefkada, Ionian Islands, Greece. Since the 2011 local government reform it is part of the municipality Lefkada, of which it is a municipal unit. It is located in the southwestern part of the island. Its population was 2,768 at the 2011 census. The seat of the municipality was in Vasiliki (pop. 395). Its area is 124.709 km², comprising about 41 percent of Lefkada Island. Its largest towns are Ágios Pétros (pop. 422), Vasilikí, Sývros (379), and Marantochóri (330). The area features beautiful beaches on the western side of the island, the most famous are in Porto Katsiki and in Ekremnoi. The Porto Katsiki Beach has been voted the second best beach in the world.

Subdivisions
The municipal unit Apollonioi is subdivided into the following communities (constituent villages in brackets):
Agios Ilias
Agios Petros (Agios Petros, Ponti Agiou Petrou)
Athani (Athani, Agios Nikolaos Niras)
Chortata
Dragano (Dragano, Panochori)
Evgiros (Evgiros, Syvota)
Komili
Kontaraina
Marantochori
Nikolis (Nikolis, Manasi)
Syvros
Vasiliki
Vournikas

Population

References

External links
Apollonioi on GTP Travel Pages (in English and Greek)

Populated places in Lefkada (regional unit)